Marta Grande (born 22 November 1987 in Civitavecchia, Lazio) is an Italian politician of the Five Star Movement. Since June 2018, she has been the chair of the Committee on Foreign and EU Affairs of the Italian Chamber of Deputies. She is also the youngest female MP in the 17th legislature.

Early life and education
Grande holds a BA from the University of Alabama in Huntsville, a MA in European studies (with a thesis on transatlantic relations), and another master's degree in international relations and diplomatic studies. She also studied in Beijing in 2012 following a course held by PKU and LSU.

Political career
Since 2013 Grande has been a member of the foreign affairs committee and member of the permanent committee on the European Union's foreign policy and external relations. Since 2015 she has been the secretary of the permanent Committee on Human Rights.

On 24 June 2014 Grande held a speech in the Italian parliament discussing Ukraine.

In June 2018 Grande was elected President of the Foreign Affairs Committee of the Italian Chamber of Deputies. She became the youngest MP and first woman to held this position.

In addition to her committee assignments, Grande has been leading the Italian delegation to the Parliamentary Assembly of the Council of Europe since 2021. In this capacity, she has served on the Committee on Culture, Science, Education and Media (since 2021) and the Sub-Committee on Education, Youth and Sport (since 2022). Since 2021, she has been one of the Assembly’s vice-presidents, under the leadership of presidents Rik Daems (2021–2022) and Tiny Kox (since 2022).

References

1987 births
Living people
People from Civitavecchia
Five Star Movement politicians
Deputies of Legislature XVII of Italy
Deputies of Legislature XVIII of Italy
21st-century Italian women politicians
University of Alabama in Huntsville alumni
20th-century Italian women
Women members of the Chamber of Deputies (Italy)